The GNM-60 is a 60mm noise reduced mortar designed for special forces and tactical groups for concealed operations. It allows troops to fire while maintaining concealment. The weapon can be operated by a single individual. The mortar is made by STC Delta.

Technical details 
Due to the special design of mortar and grenades, the system is relatively light, allowing for easy transport. Its muzzle-loaded system enables conventional operations without additional training.

Technical specification

References

External links 
 GNM-60 mortar on STC Delta website, archived by the Internet Archive

Infantry mortars
60mm mortars